José María Napoleón Ruiz Narváez (born August 18, 1948) is a Mexican singer and composer.

Life
He arrived from Aguascalientes to Mexico City in 1966. He competed in the national Méxican OTI Festival, the National final to select the Mexican entrant at the main OTI Festival in 1977. Although he ended in the last place with no points, his career went on successfully, turning into a star in Mexico.

Vicente Fernández, Pepe Aguilar, Pedro Fernández, Yuri, Franck Pourcel, Plácido Domingo and José José, and Rosario De Alba have sung his compositions.

Discography 

"El grillo" (1970)
"De vez en vez" (1975)
"Después de tanto" (1976)
"Vive" (1976)
"Pajarillo" (1977)
"Hombre" (1977)
"Un pedazo de madera" (1977)
"Porque te quiero andaré" (1977)
"Recuerdo apagado" (1978)
"Lo que no fue no será" (1979)
"Sin tu amor" (1979)
"Eres" (1980)
"Treinta años" (1980)
"Ella se llamaba" (1980)
"Mientras llueve" (1982)
"Celos" (1982)
"Nunca cambies" (1984)
"Corazón, corazón" (1985)
"Déjame Amarte De Nuevo" (1974)

External links 
 Official Website

References

1950 births
Living people
Mexican people of Spanish descent
Mexican bullfighters
Mexican male singers
Mexican people of Basque descent
Mexico in the OTI Festival
Latin Grammy Lifetime Achievement Award winners
Latin music songwriters